The 1907 Vanderbilt Commodores football team represented Vanderbilt University during the 1907 Southern Intercollegiate Athletic Association football season. The team's head coach was Dan McGugin, who served his fourth season in that capacity.  Members of the Southern Intercollegiate Athletic Association, the Commodores played five home games in Nashville, Tennessee and finished the season with a record 5–1–1 and 3–0 in SIAA.

Vanderbilt gave a shock to the football world by tying  Eastern power Navy 6–6. The Commodores also beat Georgia Tech by the largest margin in coach John Heisman's tenure, and beat a powerful Sewanee team on a double pass play which Grantland Rice called the greatest thrill in his years of watching sports. The only loss suffered all season was to Western power Michigan.

Schedule

Season summary

Week 1: Kentucky State College
Vanderbilt opened the season with a 40–0 defeat of Kentucky State College, boosting morale. 1,800 people attended the game.

The starting lineup against Kentucky State: V. Blake (left end), McLain (left tackle), Sherrill (left guard), Stone (center), King (right guard), Hasslock (right tackle), B. Blake (right end), Costen (quarterback), Campbell (left halfback), Craig (right halfback), Morton (fullback).

Week 2: at Navy

The Commodores held the Navy team to a 6–6 tie in one of the highlights of  the season. McGugin proved prophetic; before the game he said "We have an even chance with the Navy." The Nashville papers said Vandy should've won, and Grantland Rice criticized the officiating,  as did coach McGugin. Navy's captain Tootsie Douglas  called the tie "the bitterest pill I have ever had to swallow."

The starting lineup against Navy: V. Blake (left end), McLain (left tackle), Sherrill (left guard), Stone (center), King (right guard), Hasslock (right tackle), B. Blake (right end), Costen (quarterback), Campbell (left halfback), Craig (right halfback), Morton (fullback).

Week 3: Rose Polytechnic
Vanderbilt smashed Rose Polytechnic 65–10. Rose had played Vanderbilt close in prior seasons, and so was a good warm-up act to Michigan.

Week 4: Michigan

Vanderbilt's only loss was the first home loss in three years, and only the third in the four years of Dan McGugin's coaching career at Vanderbilt —and all were to Michigan teams. The Commodores had a 26 game home win streak until Michigan stopped them on November 2.  The Commodores lost to the Michigan Wolverines 8–0, in front of a crowd of 8,000 at Dudley Field in Nashville, snapping a 26-game home win streak.  The crowd was the largest up to that date to see a football game south of the Mason–Dixon Line.  The game was "a big society event in the south", and the elite of Nashville, Chattanooga, and Memphis were in attendance.  The game matched Michigan head coach Fielding H. Yost against his former player and brother-in-law, Dan McGugin.  Owing to the relationship between Yost and McGugin, the two teams played nine times between 1905 and 1923, with Michigan winning eight games and tying one.

The game was played under clear skies and warm weather, the temperature being too warm "for the invaders' liking." "Octy" Graham scored all of Michigan's points, converting on two of three field goal attempts.  The tide of the game was set when Vanderbilt's quarterback, Sam Costen, dropped six of the first punts he received.

The game most prominently featured a duel between star German centers. The Michigan Alumnus wrote: "'Germany' Schulz was far and away the star of the game.  In his usual style he was in every play, tackling runners for loss, falling on the ball in fumbles, and opening wide holes in the line for Michigan gains. . . . [H]e showed conclusively that he has no equal in the keystone position." A Nashville source wrote "In the duel of centers, Stone of Vanderbilt, had the best of "Germany" Schulz. Michigan's massive center. Stone's play was spectacular all the way."

The starting lineup against Michigan: V. Blake (left end), McLain (left tackle), Sherrill (left guard), Stone (center), King (right guard), Hasslock (right tackle), B. Blake (right end), Costen (quarterback), Campbell (left halfback), Craig (right halfback), Morton (fullback).

Week 5: vs. Mississippi
In a heavy rain, the Commodores defeated Mississippi 60–0. Vanderbilt had the substitutes in after ten minutes of play; and made ten touchdowns and ten goals.

The starting lineup against Mississippi: V. Blake (left end), McLain (left tackle), Sherrill (left guard), Stone (center), Hall (right guard), King (right tackle), B. Blake (right end), Costen (quarterback), Campbell (left halfback), Craig (right halfback), Morton (fullback).

Week 6: Georgia Tech
In the sixth week of play, Vanderbilt beat Georgia Tech by the largest margin in coach John Heisman's tenure, 54–0. "The rooters stridently called: "We want sixty! We want sixty!" According to sportswriter Grantland Rice, Heisman's team had a fine line but weak ends and backfield.

The highlight of the first half came on a triple pass. Sam Costen passed the ball to Honus Craig, Craig passed it to Morton and Morton passed it to Bob Blake, who ran to the side and passed it 25 yards back to Costen. Costen ran the remaining 20 yards for a touchdown.

Towards the end of the game, every regular with the exception of Stone was relieved with reserves.

The starting lineup against Georgia Tech: V. Blake (left end), McLain (left tackle), Sherrill (left guard), Stone (center), King (right guard), Hasslock (right tackle), B. Blake (right end), Costen (quarterback), Campbell (left halfback), Craig (right halfback), Morton (fullback).

Week 7: Sewanee

Vanderbilt faced one of Sewanee's greatest teams in its annual rivalry game which would decide the SIAA championship. Vanderbilt won a close game 17–12.

With the Commodores down 11–12, the game featured a 35-yard catch by Vanderbilt center Stein Stone, on a double-pass play then thrown near the end zone by Bob Blake that set up the 3-yard Honus Craig touchdown run to win at the very end. The double pass was cited by Grantland Rice as the greatest thrill he ever witnessed in his years of watching sports. McGugin in Spalding's Football Guide's summation of the season in the SIAA wrote "The standing. First, Vanderbilt; second, Sewanee, a mighty good second;" and that Sewanee back Aubrey Lanier "came near winning the Vanderbilt game by his brilliant dashes after receiving punts."

The starting lineup against Sewanee: V. Blake (left end), McLain (left tackle), Sherrill (left guard), Stone (center), King (right guard), Hasslock (right tackle), B. Blake (right end), Costen (quarterback), Campbell (left halfback), Craig (right halfback), Morton (fullback).

Post-season
End Bob Blake made Walter Camp's All-America Honorable Mention, as well as the first team All-American selection of Michigan coach Fielding Yost. Sam Costen was elected captain for next year. Vandy claimed the championship of the South.

Players

Depth chart
The following chart provides a visual depiction of Vanderbilt's lineup during the 1907 season with games started at the position reflected in parenthesis. The chart mimics a short punt formation while on offense, with the quarterback under center.

Varsity letter winners
"Wearers of the V."

Line

Backfield

Unlisted
Pickens
Pittman
Souby
Stewart
Williams

Staff
H. E. Palmer, manager

Notes

References

Bibliography
 

Vanderbilt
Vanderbilt Commodores football seasons
Vanderbilt Commodores football